Brian Joo (Korean name: Joo Min-gyu; born January 10, 1981), better known professionally as Brian, is a Korean American singer and one-half of the R&B duo Fly to the Sky. His first solo album, The Brian was released in December 2006. His second solo album, Manifold was released in December 2009.

Early life and education 
Brian Joo was born on January 10, 1981, in Los Angeles, California to Korean immigrant parents. His original Korean name was Joo Jin-taek, but his father changed it to Joo Min-gyu when he was three years old. Joo grew up in New Jersey and spoke Korean at home. His parents worked at casinos in Atlantic City and his brother, Jason Joo, is an officer in the U.S. Navy.

While attending Holy Spirit High School, a friend signed him up for an audition with Brothers Entertainment without Joo's knowledge. The company has discovered several Korean-Americans who wish to pursue an entertainment career in South Korea. After several months of training, he was sent to SM Entertainment in South Korea, and on December 9, 1999, made his debut as one of the two members of Fly to the Sky, along with Hwanhee, at the age of 17.

Joo was accepted to Rutgers University, but did not end up attending due to the demands of his music career. He later enrolled in Dongguk University, where he graduated from the Department of Theatre and Film.

Fly to the Sky 

Joo is a member of Fly to the Sky with Hwanhee, Brian sang and also rapped. As Fly to the Sky made its musical transition from bubblegum pop to heavy R&B, Joo felt discontent and inferior, and felt that Hwanhee was more appreciated for his vocal skills.

Joo has appeared on television many times. Since 2005, he has appeared on a number of variety shows, including hosting MBC's Music Core in 2006 and becoming a host for SBS' Green Gold in 2009.

In August 2009, Fly to the Sky decided to work on separate projects and have become solo singers under different labels.

On April 14, 2014, Brian Joo announced on his Twitter that Fly to the Sky will be making their comeback in May. The band later signed up with H2 Media, the agency of member Hwanhee.  Their 9th new album "Continiuum" has been released and the main title track is "You You You". The single peaked at number one on Gaon digital chart.

Although being on hiatus for five years, Hwanhee and Brian expressed their good teamwork and solid friendship in an interview, telling "There were rumors about us being gay and liking men, but it's not like that. We're that close so people feel that way about us".

Solo career

2006-2008: Show! Music Core and solo debut with The Brian 
In May 2006, Joo became a co-host of Show! Music Core alongside actress Jang Mi-inae. Later that year, he won the Popularity Award at the 2006 MBC Entertainment Awards for his work on the show.

Joo released his debut solo album, The Brian, on December 18, 2006. The album incorporated diverse genres such as soul and jazz. With the album, Joo said he hoped to gain more respect as an artist, rather than being known as "Fly to the Sky without Hwanhee". He described one of his motivations for making a solo album:

The album debuted at #7 on the monthly Recording Industry Association of Korea album chart and sold 15,376 copies by the end of December. The album's lead single, a ballad titled "Don't Go", topped various South Korean real-time music charts upon its release and was awarded first place on Inkigayo on January 21. While promoting the album, Joo was diagnosed with vocal cord nodules and had to adjust his schedule to avoid further injury.

Joo left his position on Show! Music Core in November 2007 to focus on overseas promotions.

2009-2012: Manifold, Unveiled, and musical theater 
On December 10, 2009, Joo released his second solo album, Manifold, which sold 15,000 pre-order copies. The album was a departure from Joo's earlier work and featured hip hop and dance music songs, including the lead single "My Girl" featuring hip hop duo Supreme Team.

Joo signed an exclusive contract with Jellyfish Entertainment in October 2010.

On April 7, 2011, Joo released his first mini album, Unveiled, including for its lead single an emotional ballad titled "Love Is Over Now". Unveiled debuted at #7 on the Gaon Album Chart. To promote the album, Joo went on a solo tour of the United States in June 2011 with stops in Seattle, Atlanta, Los Angeles, and New York.

Upon returning to South Korea, Joo made his musical theater debut in August in a Seoul production of Rent, in which he played the role of Mark. In 2012 at the Shrine Auditorium in Los Angeles, California, Joo performed as a principal cast member representing the Korean culture in a Broadway-style musical called Loving the Silent Tears and based on Supreme Master Ching Hai's poetry collection to commemorate the 19th Anniversary of Supreme Master Ching Hai Day.

Discography

Studio albums

Extended plays

Filmography

Television shows

Television series

Web series

Radio shows

Controversy

Joo's ties to the United States stirred controversy in 2002, when Fly to the Sky was the host of the radio show "1010 Club". At that time, the death of two teenage Korean girls in the Highway 56 Accident caused a surge in anti-American sentiment in Korea. Because of Joo's American citizenship, guest Hyun Jin-Young asked for his opinion regarding this matter. In response, Joo stated that while the American soldier must be brought to justice, he did not want relations between Korea and the United States, his home country, to become strained. His comments were reported as "You can't talk badly about the United States in front of me. I'm an American. Please only hate the American soldiers (responsible for the incident)." (내 앞에서 미국에 대해 나쁘게 얘기하면 안 된다. 나는 미국인이다. (사건을 일으킨) 미군 부대만 싫어해달라)

Joo's statement was met with harsh criticism and backlash. Not long after the airing he posted a statement on the website of 1010 Club, in an attempt to clarify his position:

Notes

References

External links 
 Brian Joo - Official Website

1981 births
Living people
SM Town
Jellyfish Entertainment artists
Dongguk University alumni
Rutgers University alumni
American musicians of Korean descent
American people of South Korean descent
Singers from New Jersey
People from Absecon, New Jersey
Fly to the Sky members
Holy Spirit High School (New Jersey) alumni
K-pop singers
American contemporary R&B singers
American male singers
American emigrants to South Korea
American television hosts
Korean-language singers of the United States
South Korean Christians
21st-century American singers